Parent Rescue was a six-part documentary series, produced and broadcast by the SBS. The series explored the exasperating job of raising kids and looked at the role of the family services group Karitane in helping desperate parents.

References

See also 
 List of Australian television series

2000s Australian documentary television series
Special Broadcasting Service original programming
2007 Australian television series debuts
2007 Australian television series endings